The February Revolution in Russia officially ended a centuries-old regime of antisemitism in the Russian Empire, legally abolishing the Pale of Settlement. However, the previous legacy of antisemitism was continued and furthered by the Soviet state, especially under Joseph Stalin. After 1948, antisemitism reached new heights in the Soviet Union, especially during the anti-cosmopolitan campaign, in which numerous Yiddish-writing poets, writers, painters and sculptors were arrested or killed. This campaign culminated in the so-called Doctors' plot, in which a group of doctors (almost all of whom were Jewish) were subjected to a show trial for supposedly having plotted to assassinate Stalin. Although repression eased after Stalin's death, persecution of Jews would continue until the late 1980s (see: refuseniks).

History

Before the revolution

Under the Tsars, Jews – who numbered approximately 5 million in the Russian Empire in the 1880s, and mostly lived in poverty – had been confined to a Pale of Settlement, where they experienced prejudice and persecution, often in the form of discriminatory laws, and they had often been the victims of pogroms, many of which were either organized or tacitly approved of by the Tsarist authorities. In response to the oppression which they were being subjected to, many Jews either emigrated from the Russian Empire or joined radical political parties, such as the Jewish Bund, the Bolsheviks, the Socialist Revolutionary Party, and the Mensheviks. There were also numerous antisemitic publications of the era which gained widespread circulation.

After the revolution

February Revolution and Provisional Government
The Russian Provisional Government cancelled all restrictions imposed on the Jews by the Tsarist regime, in a move parallel to the Jewish emancipation in Western Europe that had taken place during the 19th century abolishing Jewish disabilities.

The Bolsheviks
The October Revolution saw the Bolsheviks seize power in a coup. They were strongly opposed to Judaism (and indeed to any religion) and conducted an extensive campaign to suppress the religious traditions among the Jewish population, alongside traditional Jewish culture. In 1918, the Yevsektsiya was established to promote Marxism, secularism and Jewish assimilation into Soviet society, and supposedly bringing Communism to the Jewish masses.

In August 1919 Jewish properties, including synagogues, were seized by the Soviet government and many Jewish communities were dissolved. The anti-religious laws against all expressions of religion and religious education were being taken out on all religious groups, including the Jewish communities. Many Rabbis and other religious officials were forced to resign from their posts under the threat of violent persecution. This type of persecution continued on into the 1920s. Jews were also frequently placed disproportionately on the front lines of Russian wars in the early 1900s as well as WW2. As a result, large numbers of Jews emigrated out of Russia to places like the United States. Changing their family's last name during emigration to reduce perceived risk was not uncommon.

In March 1919, Lenin delivered a speech "On Anti-Jewish Pogroms" where he denounced pogroms perpetrated by the Red Army, and called antisemitism an "attempt to divert the hatred of the workers and peasants from the exploiters toward the Jews". The speech was in line with the previous condemnation of the antisemitic pogroms perpetrated by anti-Bolshevik forces (White Army, Ukrainian People's Army and others) during the Russian Civil War. In 1914, Lenin had said "No nationality in Russia is as oppressed and persecuted as the Jews".

Information campaigns against antisemitism were conducted in the Red Army and in the workplaces, and a provision forbidding the incitement of propaganda against any ethnicity became part of Soviet law. The official stance of the Soviet government under Joseph Stalin in 1934 was to oppose antisemitism "anywhere in the world" and claimed to express "fraternal feelings to the Jewish people", praising the Jewish contributions towards international socialism.

Under Stalin

Joseph Stalin emerged as dictator of the Soviet Union following a power struggle with Leon Trotsky after Lenin's death. Stalin has been accused of resorting to antisemitism in some of his arguments against Trotsky, who was a Russian of Jewish descent. Those who knew Stalin, such as Nikita Khrushchev, suggest that Stalin had long harbored negative sentiments toward Jews that had manifested themselves before the 1917 Revolution. As early as 1907, Stalin wrote a letter differentiating between a "Jewish faction" and a "true Russian faction" in Bolshevism. Stalin's secretary Boris Bazhanov stated that Stalin made crude antisemitic outbursts even before Lenin's death. Stalin adopted antisemitic policies which were reinforced with his anti-Westernism. Antisemitism, as historian, Orientalist and anthropologist Raphael Patai and geneticist Jennifer Patai Wing put it in their book The Myth of the Jewish Race, was "couched in the language of opposition to Zionism". Since 1936, in the show trial of "Trotskyite-Zinovievite Terrorist Center", the suspects, prominent Bolshevik leaders, were accused of hiding their Jewish origins under Slavic names.

On 3 May 1939, Stalin fired foreign minister Maxim Litvinov, who was closely identified with the anti-Nazi position. Stalin said "The Soviet Government intended to improve its relations with Hitler and if possible sign a pact with Nazi Germany. As a Jew and an avowed opponent of such a policy, Litvinov stood in the way." The move opened Stalin's way to close ties with the Nazi state, as well as a quiet campaign removing Jews in high Soviet positions.

After World War II antisemitism escalated openly as a campaign against the "rootless cosmopolitan" (a euphemism for "Jew"). In his speech titled "On Several Reasons for the Lag in Soviet Dramaturgy" at a plenary session of the board of the Soviet Writers' Union in December 1948, Alexander Fadeyev equated the cosmopolitans with the Jews. In this anti-cosmopolitan campaign, many leading Jewish writers and artists were killed. Terms like "rootless cosmopolitans", "bourgeois cosmopolitans", and "individuals devoid of nation or tribe" appeared in newspapers. The Soviet press accused cosmopolitans of "groveling before the West", helping "American imperialism", "slavish imitation of bourgeois culture" and "bourgeois aestheticism". Victimization of Jews in the USSR at the hands of the Nazis was denied, Jewish scholars were removed from the sciences, and emigration rights were denied to Jews. The Stalinist antisemitic campaign ultimately culminated in the Doctors' plot in 1953. According to Patai and Patai, the Doctors' plot was "clearly aimed at the total liquidation of Jewish cultural life". Communist antisemitism under Stalin shared a common characteristic with Nazi and fascist antisemitism in its belief in a "Jewish world conspiracy".

Soviet antisemitism extended to policy in the Soviet Occupation Zone of Germany. As the historian Norman Naimark has noted, officials in the Soviet Military Administration in Germany (SVAG) by 1947–48 displayed a "growing obsession" with the presence of Jews in the military administration, in particular their presence in the Cadres Department's Propaganda Administration. Jews in German universities who resisted Sovietisation were characterized as having "non-Aryan background" and being "lined up with the bourgeois parties".

Scholars such as Erich Goldhagen claim that following the death of Stalin, the policy of the Soviet Union towards Jews and the Jewish question became more discreet, with indirect antisemitic policies over direct physical assault. Erich Goldhagen suggests that despite being famously critical of Stalin, Nikita Khrushchev did not view Stalin's antisemitic policies as "monstrous acts" or "rude violations of the basic Leninist principles of the nationality policy of the Soviet state".

Under Brezhnev
Antisemitism in the Soviet Union once again peaked during the rule of Leonid Brezhnev, following Israeli victory in the 1967 Six-Day War. "Anti-Zionist" propaganda, including the film Secret and Explicit, was often antisemitic in nature. Many of Brezhnev's close advisors, most principally Mikhail Suslov, were also fervent antisemites. Jewish emigration to Israel and the United States, which had been allowed in limited amounts under the rule of Khrushchev, once more became heavily restricted, primarily due to concerns that Jews were a security liability or treasonous. Would-be emigrants, or refuseniks, often required a vyzov, or special invitation from a relative living abroad, for their application to be even considered by the Soviet authorities. In addition, in order to emigrate, one needed written permission from all immediate family members. The rules were often stretched in order to prevent Jews from leaving, and ability for appeal was rarely permitted. Substantial fees were also required to be paid, both to emigrate and as "reimbursement".

Institutional racism against Jews was widespread in the Soviet Union under Brezhnev, with many sectors of the government being off-limits. Following the failure of the Dymshits–Kuznetsov hijacking affair, in which 12 refuseniks unsuccessfully attempted to hijack a plane and flee west, crackdowns on Jews and the refusenik movement followed. Informal centres for studying the Hebrew language, the Torah and Jewish culture were closed.

Immediately following the Six-Day War in 1967, the antisemitic conditions started causing desire to emigrate to Israel for many Soviet Jews. A Jewish Ukrainian radio engineer, Boris Kochubievsky, sought to move to Israel. In a letter to Brezhnev, Kochubievsky stated:

Within the week he was called in to the KGB bureau and without questioning, was taken to a mental institution in his hometown of Kiev (for more information, see: Political abuse of psychiatry in the Soviet Union).   While this may seem as an isolated incident, the aftermath of the Six-Day War affected almost every Jew within the Soviet Union.   Jews who had been subject to assimilation under previous regimes were now confronted with a new sense in vigour and revival in their Jewish faith and heritage.
On February 23, 1979, a six-page article was distributed throughout the cities of Moscow and Leningrad, which criticized Brezhnev and seven other individuals for being "Zionist". The article contained traces of deep-rooted antisemitism in which the anonymous author, a member of the Russian Liberation Organization, set out ways to identify Zionists; these included "hairy chest and arms", "shifty eyes", and a "hook-like nose".

A major stride was made in the United States in regards to helping the Soviet Jews on 18 October 1974, when Senator Henry M. Jackson, National Security Advisor Henry Kissinger, Senator Jacob Javits and Congressman Charles Vanik met to discuss the finalization of the "Jackson–Vanik amendment" which had been in limbo in the United States Congress for nearly a year. After the meeting, Jackson told reporters that a "historic understanding in the area of human rights" had been met and while he did not "comment on what the Russians have done [...] there [had] been a complete turnaround here on the basic points". The amendment set out to reward the Soviet Union for letting some Soviet Jews leave the country.

On February 22, 1981, in a speech, which lasted over 5 hours, Soviet Premier Leonid Brezhnev denounced antisemitism in the Soviet Union. While Lenin and Stalin had much of the same in various statements and speeches, this was the first time that a high-ranking Soviet official had done so in front of the entire Party. Brezhnev acknowledged that antisemitism existed within the Eastern Bloc and saw that many different ethnic groups existed whose "requirements" were not being met.  For decades, people of different ethnic, or religious backgrounds were assimilated into Soviet society and denied the ability or resources to get the education or practice their religion as they had previously done. Brezhnev made it official Soviet Policy to provide these ethnic groups with these "requirements" and cited a fear of the "emergence of inter-ethnic tensions" as the reason.   The announcement of the policy was followed with a generic, but significant Party message;

While to most, the issue of antisemitism seemed to be dropped very casually and almost accidentally, it was very much calculated and planned, as was everything else the Party did. At this time the Soviet Union was feeling pressure from around the world to solve many human rights violations that were taking place within their borders, and the statement responded to the inquiries of countries such as Australia and Belgium. While the Party seemed to be taking a hard stance against antisemitism, the fact remained that antisemitic propaganda had long been present in the Soviet Union, making it extremely difficult to solve the problems right away. Furthermore, Jewish organizations in Washington D.C. were calling attention to the problems of Soviet Jewry to American leaders.

Antisemitism, however, remained widespread both within and outside the Communist Party; antisemitic media continued to be published with the assent of the government, while antisemitic propaganda (believed variously to be the work of far-right groups or the Soviet government) spread throughout cities in the Soviet Union during the late 1970s. Mikhail Savitsky's 1979 painting, Summer Theatre, depicted a Nazi extermination camp guard and Jewish prisoner grinning between a pile of Russian corpses.

Right-wing movements
The first reports of neo-Nazi organizations in the USSR appeared in the second half of the 1950s. In some cases, the participants were attracted primarily by the aesthetics of Nazism (rituals, parades, uniforms, the cult of physical fitness, architecture). Other organizations were more interested in the ideology of the Nazis, their program, and the image of Adolf Hitler. The formation of neo-Nazism in the USSR dates back to the turn of the 1960s and 1970s; during this period, these organizations still preferred to operate underground.

Modern Russian neo-paganism took shape in the second half of the 1970s and is associated with the activities of supporters of antisemitism, especially the Moscow Arabist Valery Yemelyanov (pagan name Velemir) and the former dissident and neo-Nazi activist Alexey Dobrovolsky (pagan name Dobroslav).

In 1957, under the influence of the Hungarian Revolution, Dobrovolsky created the Russian National Socialist Party and was later imprisoned. Since 1964, he collaborated with the National Alliance of Russian Solidarists. On December 5, 1965, he organized a demonstration on Pushkin Square. In 1968, he was involved in the Trial of the Four. In 1969, Dobrovolsky bought a library and immersed himself in history, esotericism and parapsychology, collaborating with Valery Yemelyanov. In 1989, he took part in the creation of the "Moscow Pagan Community", which was headed by Alexander Belov (Selidor), and approved the eight-beam "kolovrat" as a symbol of "resurgent paganism." Since 1990, he collaborated with the neo-pagan Russian Party of Korchagin. Dobrovolsky conducted the first mass rite of naming, a rite that became widespread in the Rodnovery. Later, he retired to the abandoned village of Vasenyovo in Kirov Oblast, where he lived as a hermit and spent the summer holidays of Kupala. He led the "Russian Liberation Movement" (ROD).

Valery Yemelyanov (pagan name - Velemir) in 1967 defended his thesis at a Higher Party School. A good knowledge of the Arabic language and the peculiarities of the service allowed Yemelyanov to get extensive contacts in the Arab world, including the most senior officials. From these sources he drew his understanding of "Zionism". Yemelyanov was the author of one of the first manifestos of Russian neo-paganism - an anonymous letter titled "Critical notes of a Russian person on the patriotic magazine "Veche"", published in 1973. After the appearance of the notes, the journal was liquidated in 1974, and its editor, V. Osipov, was arrested.

In the 1970s, Yemelyanov wrote the book "Dezionization", first published in 1979 in Arabic in Syria in the Al-Baʽath newspaper at the behest of Syrian President Hafez al-Assad. At the same time, a photocopied copy of this book, allegedly issued by the Palestine Liberation Organization in Paris, was distributed in Moscow. The book tells about the ancient civilization of the "Aryans-Veneti" (in particular, ideas from the Book of Veles are used; for example, Prav-Yav-Nav), the only autochthons of Europe who lived in harmony with nature and creating the first alphabet, but defeated by the Judeo-"Zionists", who were hybrids of criminals of different races, created by Egyptian and Mesopotamian priests. Since then, the world has been doomed to the eternal struggle of two forces - nationalist patriots and "Talmudic Zionists".

According to Yemelyanov, a powerful tool in the hands of "Zionism" is Christianity, created by the Jews specifically for the purpose of enslaving other peoples. To Yemelyanov, Jesus was at the same time "an ordinary Jewish racist" and a "Mason", and Prince Vladimir Svyatoslavich was endowed with Jewish blood. Among the illustrations for this book were reproductions of paintings by Konstantin Vasilyev on the theme of the struggle of Russian heroes with evil forces and, above all, the painting "Ilya Muromets defeats the Christian plague", which has since become popular with neo-pagans.

The dissemination of the ideas described by Yemelyanov in "Dezionization" and at lectures in the Knowledge Society in the early 1970s caused an international protest, declared by the American Senator Jacob Javits to the Soviet Ambassador to the USA Anatoly Dobrynin in 1973, after which his lectures have been discontinued.

Yemelyanov began to accuse a wide range of people of "Zionism", including the ruling elite, headed by Leonid Brezhnev. In 1980, he tried to distribute copies of "Dezionization" among the members of the Politburo of the Central Committee of the CPSU and in its secretariat. In 1987, he founded the World Anti-Zionist and Anti-Masonic Front "Pamyat" (the neo-pagan wing of the "Pamyat" Society).

In 1970, a text called “The Word of the Nation” was distributed in the USSR in samizdat. It expressed the rejection of the liberal democratic ideas that were common at that time among part of the Russian dissidents, and the ideas of a strong state and the formation of a new elite were proclaimed as a program. To maintain order and fight crime, authoritarian power must rely on "people's druzhinas" (analogue of the "Black Hundreds") beyond the jurisdiction of any law. The author put forward demands to combat the "infringement of the rights of the Russian people" and "Jewish monopoly in science and culture", "biological degeneration of the white race" due to the spread of "democratic cosmopolitan ideas", "accidental hybridization" of races, a call for a "national revolution", after which "real Russians by blood and spirit" should become the ruling nation.

The full Russian version of this document was published in the emigrant magazine "Veche" in 1981, where the author wrote about the United States possibly turning into "an instrument for achieving world domination by the black race" and noted the special mission of Russia to save world civilization. The "Word of the Nation" was signed by "Russian patriots". Later it became known that its author was A. M. Ivanov (Skuratov), one of the founders of the Russian neopagan movement and a supporter of the struggle against "Judeo-Christianity."

At the end of 1971, a text entitled "Letter to Solzhenitsyn" signed by a certain Ivan Samolvin was also distributed in samizdat. The "Letter" talked about the connections of the Jews with the Masons and a secret conspiracy to seize power over the world. The October Revolution is presented as the realization of these secret designs. It is argued that the "true history" of the ancestors of the Russian people is carefully hidden from the people. The letter was written by Valery Yemelyanov, also one of the founders of Russian neopaganism. These documents had a significant impact on the development of Russian racism and neo-Nazism.

In Soviet times, the founder of the movement of Peterburgian Vedism (a branch of Slavic neopaganism) Viktor Bezverkhy (Ostromysl) revered Hitler and Heinrich Himmler and propagated racial and antisemitic theories in a narrow circle of his students, calling for the deliverance of mankind from "inferior offspring", allegedly arising from interracial marriages. He called such "inferior people" "bastards", referred to them as "Zhyds, Indians or gypsies and mulattoes" and believed that they prevent society from achieving social justice. 

At the age of 51, Bezverkhy took an oath "to devote his whole life to the fight against Judaism - the mortal enemy of mankind." The text of this oath, written in blood, was found on him during a search in 1988. Bezverkhy developed the theory of "Vedism", according to which, in particular: "all peoples will be sifted through a sieve of racial identity, the Aryans will be united, Asian, African and Indian elements will be put in their place, and the mulattoes will be eliminated as unnecessary." On the basis of the informal "Union of the Volkhvs" that existed since 1986, Bezverhim founded the "Union of the Veneti" in Leningrad in June 1990.

The first public manifestations of neo-Nazis in Russia took place in 1981 in Kurgan, and then in Yuzhnouralsk, Nizhny Tagil, Sverdlovsk, and Leningrad.

In 1982, on Hitler's birthday, a group of Moscow high school students held a Nazi demonstration on Pushkinskaya Square.

See also
Antisemitism in Russia
Antisemitism in the Russian Empire
History of the Jews in Russia
History of the Jews in the Soviet Union
The Holocaust in Russia
The Holocaust in the Soviet Union
Israel–Russia relations
Jewish Autonomous Oblast
Person of Jewish ethnicity
Racism in Russia
Racism in the Soviet Union
Refusenik
Religion in Russia
Religion in the Soviet Union
Soviet Anti-Zionism
Anti-Zionist Committee of the Soviet Public
Soviet Union and the Arab–Israeli conflict

Notes

References

 .
 .
 .
 .
 .
 .
 .
 .
 .
 .

 
Soviet Union
Jews and Judaism in the Soviet Union